The 2010 Sydney Roosters season was the 103rd in the club's history. Having finished with the 'wooden-spoon' (last) in 2009 they competed in the National Rugby League's 2010 Telstra Premiership, finishing 6th (out of 16). The Roosters went on to play in the 2010 NRL Grand Final, losing to the St. George Illawarra Dragons.

Pre-season
The Sydney Roosters pre-season schedule begun with a "thank you" testimonial for Todd Carney the club that kept him playing Rugby League, the Atherton Roosters. A match was also scheduled against the New Zealand Warriors in Rotorua one day later. Coach Brian Smith sent a 22-man squad to each destination, with Smith and one of his assistant coaches, Rohan Smith heading to Rotorua and his other assistant coach Trent Robinson taking the other 22-man squad to Atherton.

The team that headed to Atherton won quite convincingly. This match saw Todd Carney score 6 points in the 68-18 win for the Roosters, in which JP Du Plessis scored a hat-trick including a try from his very first touch of the football. The team that flew out to Rotorua, on the other hand, under the leadership of Anthony Minichiello, had much tougher opposition and were well beaten 26-8 under the watchful eye of almost 10,000 supporters.

The following week, the Sydney Roosters are due to play their annual Foundation Cup match against the Wests Tigers. This will be the fourth edition of the match, with the Roosters being victorious on all of the 3 previous occasions.

The Sydney Roosters pre-season schedule concluded with a win against the Parramatta Eels at Central Coast Stadium.

Results

Regular season

Results
The Roosters' season was highlighted by several periods. Firstly, the Chooks made a bright start winning two from two but were flogged by the Canterbury Bulldogs and during the middle of the season the Roosters seemed destined to continue with a win–loss-win-loss pattern. They also won five in a row towards the end of the season, then lost three before coming back to convincingly beat Manly, 30-14. Despite a clear run through the finals, including the almighty 100 minute epic against the Tigers, they lost the Grand Final, 32-8, against St. George Illawarra.

Standings

Kit and Sponsors

Steggles
The Sydney Roosters reaffirmed their 'New Beginning' motto by announcing their new major sponsor, Steggles. As a part of the agreement, the clubs 'New Attitude' of Community Engagement would be embraced through a new initiative, the Charity Nest. The three-year deal could see up to $250,000 donated to charities in the 2010 season.

For every point the Sydney Roosters beat their opposition by in the 2010 season, Steggles would donate $1,000 to Charity Nest, with an extra $250 contributed by the Roosters.

Player Summary

References

Sydney Roosters seasons
Sydney Roosters season